Max N. Rose (born November 28, 1986) is an American military officer and politician who served as a United States Representative from New York for a single term from 2019 to 2021. A moderate Democrat, he served on the committees for Homeland Security and Veteran's Affairs and played a key role in bringing a stalled bill for a fund for victims of the September 11 attacks to a vote in the United States House of Representatives. Rose served in the Biden administration as senior advisor to the United States Secretary of Defense for COVID-19 from January 2021 to July 2021.

From 2012 to 2013, Rose served in the U.S. Army as a platoon leader in combat in the War in Afghanistan. Wounded while on duty, he was awarded a Bronze Star and Purple Heart.

In 2018, Rose defeated incumbent Republican Dan Donovan to win election to New York's 11th congressional district. The district includes all of Staten Island and parts of southern Brooklyn. In the 2020 election, Rose lost to the Republican nominee, state assemblywoman Nicole Malliotakis.

After losing reelection to Congress, Rose briefly considered running for Mayor of New York City in the 2021 election, but ultimately did not enter the race. On January 20, 2021, he was sworn in as special assistant to the U.S. Secretary of Defense for COVID-19, serving in the role for six months. In December 2021, Rose announced his candidacy in the 2022 U.S. House of Representatives elections to regain his former seat; in a rematch of the 2020 race, he was defeated by Malliotakis, earning 37.5% of the vote.

Early life and education
Rose was born in Brooklyn, New York. He is Jewish. His mother is a public school teacher and professor of social work and his father is a medical laboratory executive.

Rose grew up primarily in Park Slope, and attended elementary school there. He celebrated his bar mitzvah at Union Temple of Brooklyn in Prospect Heights.

Rose attended high school at Poly Prep Country Day School in Dyker Heights, Brooklyn. He captained its wrestling team and graduated in 2004.

He subsequently received a bachelor's degree in history from Wesleyan University, graduating in 2008. Rose became involved in politics while a student at Wesleyan University; he worked as an intern for U.S. Senator Cory Booker while Booker was mayor of Newark, New Jersey.

He later earned a master's degree in philosophy and public policy from the London School of Economics, studying there in 2008 and 2009. He also attended the University of Oxford.

Career

Military service 
Rose commissioned in the United States Army in 2010. He served nearly five years of active duty with the U.S. Army 1st Armored Division. In 2012 and 2013, he was a first lieutenant platoon leader during the War in Afghanistan, where he led a combat outpost of 30 American soldiers and suffered wounds to his face and right knee in 2013 after his Stryker armored fighting vehicle hit an improvised explosive device in northern Kandahar Province. During his service, he earned the Ranger tab (in Fort Benning), as well as on deployment in Afghanistan the Combat Infantryman Badge, a Bronze Star and a Purple Heart.

He serves as a company commander in the New York Army National Guard with the 69th Infantry Battalion, the second-oldest unit in the United States. In March 2020, while serving as a member of Congress, Rose deployed with the National Guard to assist New York City's coronavirus pandemic response effort. He and his unit spent two weeks turning a Staten Island psychiatric center into an emergency hospital for patients with COVID-19.

Post-military career 
After leaving full-time military service, Rose served as Director of Public Engagement for Brooklyn District Attorney Kenneth P. Thompson. Thompson was Brooklyn's first Black District Attorney. Rose worked on an initiative known as "Begin Again," helping people with outstanding warrants for minor offenses address them and clean their records.

Later, he served as Chief of Staff at Brightpoint Health, a nonprofit operator of medical outpatient clinics in Staten Island and elsewhere in New York City with 800 employees.

U.S. House of Representatives

Elections

2018 

Rose ran in the 2018 Democratic Party primary for New York's 11th congressional district against five other candidates, winning with 65% of the vote. In the general election, he faced Republican incumbent Dan Donovan and received endorsements from former President Barack Obama and former Vice President Joe Biden. Rose defeated Donovan, 52.8% to 46.8%, a win widely seen as an upset as most ratings of the race considered Donovan, who had won the 2016 election by 25 points, a slight favorite. He became the youngest male member of the House of Representatives.

The 11th has historically been the most conservative district in New York City, as Staten Island is the city's most conservative borough. For most of the time since the 1990s, it has been the only Republican-held district in the city, and for much of that time it has been the only area in the city in which Republicans usually do well. It has a Cook Partisan Voting Index of R+3; the other 11 districts in the city have PVIs of at least D+20. Rose was only the second Democrat to hold the seat since 1981, as well as the first since then to unseat an incumbent Republican. His victory made New York City's House delegation entirely Democratic for the second time since 1933.

2020 

In 2020, Rose was defeated in his reelection bid by State Assemblywoman Nicole Malliotakis, who represented much of the district's eastern portion. He conceded on November 11. Ultimately, Malliotakis took 53 percent of the vote to Rose's 46.8 percent.
Rose was hampered by Donald Trump carrying Staten Island with 57% of the vote, the most of any borough and ahead of Queens. Rose's participation in a George Floyd protest was also blamed for hurting his reelection chances as the 11th district has historically been home to large numbers of New York City Police Department (NYPD) officers and their families.

2022 

In December 2021, Rose announced he was running for Congress to reclaim his former seat in 2022. He won the Democratic primary on August 23, 2022, receiving 75% of the vote. He was handily defeated in the November 8, 2022 general election by Malliotakis, 37.5% to 60.7%.

Committee assignments 

 Committee on Homeland Security
 Subcommittee on Emergency Preparedness, Response and Recovery
 Subcommittee on Intelligence and Counterterrorism (Chair)
 Committee on Veterans' Affairs
 Subcommittee on Health
 Subcommittee on Oversight and Investigations

Caucus memberships 

Blue Dog Coalition
Congressional LGBT Equality Caucus
Future Forum
New Democrat Coalition
Problem Solvers Caucus

Political positions
Rose supports improving transportation infrastructure in Southern Brooklyn and Staten Island. He favors lowering the age of Medicare eligibility from 65 to 55, universal health care with a public healthcare option, and expanding access to clinics for treating opioid addiction. He voted against Democrat Nancy Pelosi for Speaker of the United States House of Representatives (he opined that she "has lost the trust of voters not just in my district, but across the country"), criticized Democratic New York City Mayor Bill de Blasio (whom he accused of "ignoring Staten Island and South Brooklyn"), and joined the Problem Solvers Caucus (which seeks to foster bipartisan cooperation). He does not support defunding the police, and instead supports higher salaries for police officers coupled with more accountability for New York Police Department leadership.

Foreign policy
He believes that the United States should rejoin the United Nations Framework Convention on Climate Change's Paris Agreement as a way to lower carbon dioxide emissions. Rose urged the State Department to designate Ukraine's Azov Battalion (converted into a Ukrainian National Guard regiment) a Foreign Terrorist Organization.

Gun control
He supports criminal background checks for gun purchases, and an assault rifle ban. In 2019, the U.S. House of Representatives passed its first piece of gun-safety legislation since 1994, the Bipartisan Background Checks Act, co-sponsored by Rose, mandating federal criminal background checks for all gun transfers, including private transactions.

War in Afghanistan
In March 2019, in response to Alexandria Ocasio-Cortez's view that Congress "could have leaned more on the larger role of other agencies before Congress decided to invade a nation without a concrete end plan," Rose wrote to the New York Daily News:"I believe it's long past time we end the war in Afghanistan, but I strongly disagree with the idea that the invasion was wrong on moral or national security grounds ... After our city and country were attacked we were very clear with the Taliban—either they give up Osama bin Laden and al Qaeda, or we would come and get them ourselves ... They chose to protect Osama bin Laden, and they rightfully paid the price."

Impeachment inquiry against Donald Trump
On October 2, 2019, Rose announced his support for an impeachment inquiry against Donald Trump for his attempt to pressure Ukraine into interfering in the 2020 presidential election.

Later career 

On December 10, 2020, Rose opened a campaign account with the campaign finance board to raise money for the 2021 New York City mayoral election, but announced on January 3, 2021, that he would not run.

On January 20, 2021, Rose was sworn in as Special Assistant to the Secretary of Defense (Senior Advisor, COVID-19) to serve under Lloyd Austin, a position Rose held until July 21, 2021

Electoral history

Personal life
Rose moved to Bay Ridge, Brooklyn, in 2015. He and his wife Leigh Byrne, a fashion stylist, were married in March 2018. They reside in St. George, Staten Island. In 2020, the couple adopted a son.

See also
 2018 United States House of Representatives election in New York, District 11
 New York's 11th congressional district
 List of Jewish members of the United States Congress

References

External links

 Max Rose for Congress campaign website 

 

1986 births
Alumni of the London School of Economics
United States Army personnel of the War in Afghanistan (2001–2021)
Candidates in the 2018 United States elections
Candidates in the 2022 United States House of Representatives elections
Democratic Party members of the United States House of Representatives from New York (state)
Jewish American people in New York (state) politics
Jewish members of the United States House of Representatives
Living people
New York National Guard personnel
People from Park Slope
Politicians from Brooklyn
Politicians from Staten Island
Poly Prep alumni
United States Army officers
Wesleyan University alumni
People from Bay Ridge, Brooklyn
21st-century American Jews
People from St. George, Staten Island